Beat Rüedi (February 19, 1920 – October 29, 2009) was an ice hockey player for the Swiss national team. He won a bronze medal at the 1948 Winter Olympics.

References 

1920 births
2009 deaths
Ice hockey players at the 1948 Winter Olympics
Olympic bronze medalists for Switzerland
Olympic ice hockey players of Switzerland
Olympic medalists in ice hockey
Medalists at the 1948 Winter Olympics